Over Kellet is a village and civil parish near Carnforth in the English county of Lancashire. The parish, which is in the City of Lancaster, includes the village of Capernwray,  at its northern end, and has a population of 778, decreasing slightly to 761 at the 2011 Census. The Lancaster Canal passes through the parish.

The village was referred to as Chellet in the Domesday Book, and more recently has also been known as Lesser Kellet.

The Church of St Cuthbert has existed since 1215.  The current building, a Grade II* listed building, was mostly built in the 16th century.  It was restored in 1864, and is now a joint Anglican/Methodist church.

Capernwray Dive Centre can be found on the outskirts of the village.

Capernwray Hall

Capernwray Hall is an 1844 country house designed by Edmund Sharpe and is a grade II* listed building. Since 1947 it has been the home of the Capernwray Missionary Fellowship of Torchbearers. Capernwray Old Hall is a different, grade II listed, late 17th-century building.

See also

Listed buildings in Over Kellet

References

External links 

Over Kellet Village

Geography of the City of Lancaster
Civil parishes in Lancashire
Villages in Lancashire